The Vetkopers and Schieringers were two opposing Frisian factional parties from the medieval period. They were responsible for a civil war that lasted for over a century (1350–1498) and which eventually led to the end of the so-called "Frisian freedom".

These factional parties arose because of an economic downturn that began in Friesland in the mid-14th century. Accompanied by a decline in monasteries and other communal institutions, social discord led to the emergence of untitled nobles called haadlingen ("headmen"), wealthy landowners possessing large tracts of land and fortified homes. The haadlingen derived their nobility not from having lands and titles conferred on them by King or Emperor but assumed power after the demise of the Hollandic counts before them.

The haadlingen took over the role of the judiciary as well offering protection to their local inhabitants. Internal struggles between regional leaders resulted in bloody conflicts and the alignment of regions along two opposing parties: the Skieringers and the Fetkeaper.

Worp van Thabor attributed the cause to a dispute between lay brothers of the Cistercian and Norbertine (Premonstratensian) orders.

The poor adopted the name  ("speakers") because they had tried firstly discussion rather than violence.

In the second half of the fifteenth century the Fetkeaper town of Groningen, which had become the dominating force in Frisia, tried to interfere in Mid-Frisian affairs. The meddling met strong opposition in Skieringer held Westergo and ended in a call for foreign help.

On 21 March 1498, a small group of Skieringers from Westergo secretly met with the stadholder-general of the Netherlands, Albert, Duke of Saxony in Medemblik requesting his help. Albrecht, who had gained a reputation as a formidable military commander, accepted and soon conquered all Friesland. Emperor Maximilian of Habsburg appointed Albrecht hereditary potestate and gubernator of Friesland in 1499.

Within a short time, occupation by the Duke and his Landsknecht military force became unacceptable to many Frisians of both factions and with the support of the Duke of Gelderland, they unsuccessfully attempted to regain their old freedoms and put.

Saxon subjugation ended Frisian municipal independence. Although still spoken at the time, the Frisian language did not have any official status. Frisian languages would disappear from the official written record; the last official document recorded in Frisian was in 1573. Frisian was replaced by Dutch and would not return until about 1800.

See also 
 Factionalism in the medieval Low Countries

References 

History of Friesland
14th century in the Netherlands
15th century in the Netherlands